Joannis Avramidis (born 23 September 1922 – 16 January 2016) was a contemporary Greek-Austrian sculptor. He was born in Batumi, Soviet Union to a family of Pontic Greeks.

He began studying painting at the state art school, but due to Stalin's ethnic cleansing, this came to an end; his father died in 1937 in prison. After many eventful years and having fled to Athens, he was conscripted in 1943 by the National Socialists and deported as a foreign worker back to Vienna. At the end of the Second World War he studied painting under Robin Christian Andersen (1945-1949) at the Academy of Fine Arts Vienna, and from 1953 to 1956 attends Fritz wotrubas' sculpture classes. Since then, the search for the 'absolute figure' stands at the centre of his work. Consequently, two eras serve as sources of inspiration for the artist, eras in which the figure and its proportions were held as the measure of all things. These are the classical antiquity and the Italian Renaissance. Avramidis allows the borders between abstraction and figurative depiction to merge in his sculptures. Softly rounded curves suggest the human body without defining it, whilst various profile views are fanned out, as though blurred. In 1962 Avramidis represented Austria in the 31st Biennale in Venice, and participated in documenta II (1964) and documenta 6 (1977). From 1965 to his retirement in 1992 he held the position of Professor of sculpture at the Academy of Fine Arts Vienna.

After the death of his wife (Annemarie Avramidis), two years earlier, he completely withdrew from the public, and during the night of January 16, 2016, Joannis Avramidis died at the age of 93 with his family.

Decorations and awards
1956: State Prize of the Academy of Fine Arts in Vienna
1958: Austrian promotion prize for sculpture
1961: Award from the City of Vienna
1961: Hugo von Montfort-prize (Bregenz)
1964: City of Vienna Prize for Visual Arts
1968: Will Grohmann-Prize (Berlin)
1973: Grand Austrian State Prize for Visual Arts
1985: Austrian Decoration for Science and Art

References

External links

www.lempertz.com Retrieved February 2019
www.galerie-albertina.at (in German) Retrieved February 2019
www.galerie-albertina.at Retrieved February 2019

1922 births
2016 deaths
Austrian sculptors
Austrian male sculptors
Greek sculptors
Austrian people of Greek descent
Soviet emigrants to Austria
Austrian people of Georgian descent
Pontic Greeks
Georgian people of Greek descent
People from Batumi
Academic staff of the Academy of Fine Arts Vienna
Recipients of the Grand Austrian State Prize
Recipients of the Austrian Decoration for Science and Art
20th-century Greek sculptors